Dalmatia (see names in other languages) is a historical region on the eastern shore of the Adriatic Sea in Croatia, a narrow belt stretching from the island of Rab in the north to the Bay of Kotor in the south. The Dalmatian Hinterland ranges in width from fifty kilometres in the north, to just a few kilometres in the south; it is mostly covered by the rugged Dinaric Alps. Seventy-nine islands (and about 500 islets) run parallel to the coast, the largest (in Dalmatia) being Brač, Pag, and Hvar. The largest city is Split, followed by Zadar, Šibenik, and Dubrovnik.

The name of the region stems from an Illyrian tribe called the Dalmatae, who lived in the area in classical antiquity. Later it became a Roman province, and as result a Romance culture emerged, along with the now-extinct Dalmatian language, later largely replaced with related Venetian. With the arrival of Croats to the area in the 6th century, who occupied most of the Hinterland, Croatian and Romance elements began to intermix in language and culture.

After the medieval Kingdom of Croatia entered a personal union with Hungary in 1102, its cities and lands were often conquered by, or switched allegiance to, the kingdoms of the region during the Middle Ages. At one time, most of Dalmatia came under rule of the Republic of Venice, which controlled most of Dalmatia between 1420 and 1797 as part of its State of the Sea, with the exception of the small but stable Republic of Ragusa (1358–1808) in the south. Between 1815 and 1918, it was a province of the Austrian Empire known as the Kingdom of Dalmatia. After the Austro-Hungarian defeat in World War I, Dalmatia was split between the Kingdom of Serbs, Croats and Slovenes, which controlled most of it, and the Kingdom of Italy, which held several smaller parts. After World War II, the People's Republic of Croatia as a part of Yugoslavia took complete control over the area. Following the dissolution of Yugoslavia, Dalmatia became part of the Republic of Croatia, and is today considered one of its four historical and cultural regions, alongside Croatia proper, Slavonia, and Istria.

Name
The regional name Dalmatia has the same root as the tribal name Dalmatae and the toponym Delminium. It is considered to be connected to the Albanian dele and its variants which include the Gheg form delmë, meaning "sheep", and to the Albanian term delmer, "shepherd". According to Vladimir Orel, the Gheg form delmë hardly has anything in common with the name of Dalmatia because it represents a variant of dele with *-mā, which is ultimately from proto-Albanian *dailā. The ancient name Dalmana, derived from the same root, testifies to the advance of the Illyrians into the middle Vardar, between the ancient towns of Bylazora and Stobi.  The medieval Slavic toponym Ovče Pole ("plain of sheep" in South Slavic) in the nearby region represents a related later development. In Albania, Delvinë represents a toponym linked to the root *dele.

The form of the regional name Dalmatia and the respective tribal name Dalmatae are later variants as is already noted by Appian (2nd century AD). His contemporary grammarian Velius Longus highlights in his treatise about orthography that the correct form of Dalmatia is Delmatia, and notes that Marcus Terentius Varro who lived about 2 centuries prior of Appian and Velius Longius, used the form Delmatia as it corresponded to the chief settlement of the tribe, Delminium. The toponym Duvno is a derivation from Delminium in Croatian via an intermediate form *Delminio in late antiquity. Its Latin form Dalmatia gave rise to its current English name. In the Venetian language, once dominant in the area, it is spelled Dalmàssia, and in modern Italian Dalmazia. The modern Croatian spelling is Dalmacija, and the modern Serbian Cyrillic spelling is Далмација.

Definition
In antiquity the Roman province of Dalmatia was much larger than the present-day Split-Dalmatia County, stretching from Istria in the north to modern-day Albania in the south. Dalmatia signified not only a geographical unit, but was an entity based on common culture and settlement types, a common narrow eastern Adriatic coastal belt, Mediterranean climate, sclerophyllous vegetation of the Illyrian province, Adriatic carbonate platform, and karst geomorphology.

Modern area

Dalmatia is today a historical region only, not formally instituted in Croatian law. Its exact extent is therefore uncertain and subject to public perception. According to Lena Mirošević and Josip Faričić of the University of Zadar:

...the modern perception of Dalmatia is mainly based on the territorial extent of the Austrian Kingdom of Dalmatia, with the exception of Rab island, which is geographically related to the Kvarner area and functionally to the Littoral–Gorski Kotar area, and with the exception of the Bay of Kotor, which was annexed to another state (Montenegro) after World War I. Simultaneously, the southern part of Lika and upper Pounje, which were not a part of Austrian Dalmatia, became a part of Zadar County. From the present-day administrative and territorial point of view, Dalmatia comprises the four Croatian littoral counties with seats in Zadar, Šibenik, Split, and Dubrovnik.

"Dalmatia" is therefore generally perceived to extend approximately to the borders of the Austrian Kingdom of Dalmatia. However, due to territorial and administrative changes over the past century, the perception can be seen to have altered somewhat with regard to certain areas, and sources conflict as to their being part of the region in modern times:

 The Bay of Kotor area in Montenegro. With the subdivision of the Kingdom of Yugoslavia into oblasts in 1922, the whole of the Bay of Kotor from Sutorina to Sutomore was granted to the Zeta Oblast, so that the border of Dalmatia was formed at that point by the southern border of the former Republic of Ragusa. The Encyclopædia Britannica defines Dalmatia as extending "to the narrows of Kotor" (i.e. the southernmost tip of continental Croatia, the Prevlaka peninsula). Other sources, however, such as the Treccani encyclopedia and the Rough Guide to Croatia still include the Bay as being part of the region.
 The island of Rab, along with the small islands of Sveti Grgur and Goli Otok, were a part of the Kingdom of Dalmatia and are historically and culturally related to the region, but are today associated more with the Croatian Littoral, due to geographical vicinity and administrative expediency.
 Gračac municipality and northern Pag. A number of sources express the view that "from the modern-day administrative point of view", the extent of Dalmatia equates to the four southernmost counties of Croatia: Zadar, Šibenik-Knin, Split-Dalmatia, and Dubrovnik-Neretva. This definition does not include the Bay of Kotor, or the islands of Rab, Sveti Grgur, and Goli Otok. It also excludes the northern part of the island of Pag, which is part of the Lika-Senj County. However, it includes the Gračac municipality in Zadar County, which was not a part of the Kingdom of Dalmatia and is not traditionally associated with the region (but instead the region of Lika).

Culture and ethnicity
The inhabitants of Dalmatia are culturally subdivided into two groups. The urban families of the coastal cities, commonly known as Fetivi, are culturally akin to the inhabitants of the Dalmatian islands (known derogatorily as Boduli). The two are together distinct, in the Mediterranean aspects of their culture, from the more numerous inhabitants of the Hinterland, such as the Dalmatian Serbs, who formed the majority population of the area. Referred to (sometimes derogatorily) as the Vlaji, their name originated from the Vlachs with whom they have no ethnic connection. 
According to the Austrian census, they constituted 18.5% of the population in 1857, which decreased to 17.4% by 1900. They formed 19.9% in the 1830-1850 period. Along with Italian (Venetian) culture, the latter are also influenced by Ottoman culture, acting as a transition between the formerly Venetian-oriented inhabitants of the coast and the formerly Ottoman-oriented Herzegovinian Croats in Herzegovina.

The former two groups (inhabitants of the islands and the cities) historically included many Venetian and Italian speakers, many of whom identified as Dalmatian Italians (especially after the Italian unification). Their presence, relative to those identifying as Croats, decreased dramatically over the course of the 19th and the first half of the 20th century. The Italian speakers (Italians and italophone Croats) constituted (according to the Italian linguist Matteo Bartoli) nearly one third of Dalmatians in the second half of the 18th century. According to the Austrian census it had decreased to 12.5% in 1865 and 3.1% in 1890. There remains, however, a strong cultural, and, in part, ancestral heritage among the natives of the cities and islands, who today almost exclusively identify as Croats, but retain a sense of regional identity. This same regional identity and heritage is displayed in the Hinterland, where the architectural and cultural legacy remains evident in many villages and towns that have a distinct Mediterranean style.

Geography and climate

Most of the land area is covered by the Dinaric Alps mountain range running from north-west to south-east. The hills and mountains lie parallel to the coast, which gave rise to the geographic term Dalmatian concordant coastline. On the coasts the climate is Mediterranean, while further inland it is moderate Mediterranean. In the mountains, winters are frosty and snowy, while summers are hot and dry. To the south winters are milder. Over the centuries many forests have been cut down and replaced with bush and brush. There is evergreen vegetation on the coast. The soils are generally poor, except on the plains where areas with natural grass, fertile soils, and warm summers provide an opportunity for tillage. Elsewhere, land cultivation is mostly unsuccessful because of the mountains, hot summers, and poor soils, although olives and grapes flourish. Energy resources are scarce. Electricity is mainly produced by hydropower stations. There is a considerable amount of bauxite.

The largest Dalmatian mountains are Dinara, Mosor, Svilaja, Biokovo, Moseć, Veliki Kozjak, and Mali Kozjak. The regional geographical unit of historical Dalmatia–the coastal region between Istria and the Bay of Kotor–includes the Orjen mountains with the highest peak in Montenegro, 1894 m. In present-day Dalmatia, the highest peak is Dinara (1913 m), which is not a coastal mountain, while the highest coastal Dinaric mountains are on Biokovo (Sv. Jure, 1762 m) and Velebit (Vaganski vrh, 1757 m), although the Vaganski vrh itself is located in Lika-Senj County.

The largest Dalmatian islands are Brač, Korčula, Dugi Otok, Mljet, Vis, Hvar, Pag and Pašman. The major rivers are Zrmanja, Krka, Cetina, and Neretva.

The Adriatic Sea's high water quality, along with the immense number of coves, islands, and channels, makes Dalmatia an attractive place for nautical races, nautical tourism, and tourism in general. Dalmatia also includes several national parks that are tourist attractions: Paklenica karst river, Kornati archipelago, Krka river rapids, and Mljet island.

Administrative division
The area of Dalmatia roughly corresponds to Croatia's four southernmost counties, listed here north to south:

History

Antiquity

Dalmatia's name is derived from the name of an Illyrian tribe called the Dalmatae who lived in the area of the eastern Adriatic coast in the 1st millennium BC. It was part of the Illyrian Kingdom between the 4th century BC and the Illyrian Wars (220, 168 BC) when the Roman Republic established its protectorate south of the river Neretva. The name "Dalmatia" was in use probably from the second half of the 2nd century BC and certainly from the first half of the 1st century BC, defining a coastal area of the eastern Adriatic between the Krka and Neretva rivers. It was slowly incorporated into Roman possessions until the Roman province of Illyricum was formally established around 32–27 BC. In 9 AD the Dalmatians raised the last in a series of revolts together with the Pannonians, but it was finally crushed and, in 10 AD, Illyricum was split into two provinces, Pannonia and Dalmatia, which spread into larger area inland to cover all of the Dinaric Alps and most of the eastern Adriatic coast.

The historian Theodor Mommsen wrote in his book, The Provinces of the Roman Empire, that all Dalmatia was fully romanized by the 4th century AD. However, analysis of archaeological material from that period has shown that the process of Romanization was rather selective. While urban centers, both coastal and inland, were almost completely romanized, the situation in the countryside was completely different. Despite the Illyrians being subject to a strong process of acculturation, they continued to speak their native language, worship their own gods and traditions, and follow their own social-political tribal organization which was adapted to Roman administration and political structure only in some necessities.

The fall of the Western Roman Empire, with the beginning of the Migration Period, left the region subject to Gothic rulers Odoacer and Theodoric the Great. They ruled Dalmatia from 480 to 535 AD, when it was restored to the Eastern Roman (Byzantine) Empire by Justinian I.

Middle Ages

The Middle Ages in Dalmatia were a period of intense rivalry among neighboring powers: the waning Byzantine Empire, the Kingdom of Croatia (later in a personal union with Hungary), the Kingdom of Bosnia, and the Republic of Venice. Dalmatia at the time consisted of the coastal cities functioning much like city-states, with extensive autonomy, but in mutual conflict and without control of the rural Hinterland. Ethnically, Dalmatia started out as a Roman region, with a Romance culture that began to develop independently, forming the now-extinct Dalmatian language.

In the Early Medieval period, Byzantine Dalmatia was ravaged by an Avar invasion that destroyed its capital, Salona, in 639 AD, an event that allowed for the settlement of the nearby Diocletian's Palace in Spalatum (Split) by Salonitans, greatly increasing the importance of the city. The Avars were followed by the great South Slavic migrations. According to the work De Administrando Imperio written by the 10th-century Byzantine Emperor Constantine VII, the Croats had arrived in Roman province of Dalmatia in the first half of the 7th century. and the Serbs settled in Dalmatia south of the Cetina river, in Pagania, Zahumlje, Travunia and Konavle.

The Slavs, loosely allied with the Avars, permanently settled the region in the first half of the 7th century AD and remained its predominant ethnic group ever since. The Croats soon formed their own realm: the Principality of Dalmatian Croatia ruled by native Princes of Guduscan origin. The meaning of the geographical term "Dalmatia" now shrank to the coastal cities and their immediate hinterland. These cities were the Romance-speaking Dalmatian city-states and remained influential as they were well fortified and maintained their connection with the Byzantine Empire. The original name of the cities was Jadera (Zadar), Spalatum (Split), Crepsa (Cres), Arba (Rab), Tragurium (Trogir), Vecla (Krk), Ragusium (Dubrovnik) and Cattarum (Kotor). The language and the laws were initially Latin, but after a few centuries they developed their own neo-Latin language (the "Dalmatico"), that lasted until the 19th century. The cities were maritime centres with a huge commerce mainly with the Italian peninsula and with the growing Republic of Venice. The two communities were somewhat hostile at first, but as the Croats became Christianized this tension increasingly subsided. A degree of cultural mingling soon took place, in some enclaves stronger, in others weaker, as Slavic influence and culture was more accentuated in Ragusa, Spalatum, and Tragurium.

In the first half of the 10th century Croatia was elevated to a kingdom by Duke Tomislav who also extended his influence further southwards to Zachlumia. As an ally of the Byzantine Empire, the King was given the status of Protector of Dalmatia, and became its de facto ruler.

In the subsequent period, the rulers of Croatia exerted influence over Dalmatian cities and islands, occasionally taking control such as the conquest of Zadar in the mid-11th century. Chronicler Thomas the Archdeacon relates that Stephen Držislav took the title "King of Dalmatia and Croatia", and that all subsequent rulers styled themselves in such manner. Petar Krešimir IV of Croatia expanded his rule to permanently incorporate Dalmatian cities and islands by 1069. Upon the death of King Demetrius Zvonimir of Croatia by the end of 1080s, the state entered a period of anarchy and would result in Hungarians under Coloman of Hungary taking control over former Dalmatian possessions along with the rest of the state by 1102.

In the High Medieval period, the Byzantine Empire was no longer able to maintain its power consistently in Dalmatia, and was finally rendered impotent so far west by the Fourth Crusade in 1204. The Republic of Venice, on the other hand, was in the ascendant, while the Croatia became increasingly influenced by Hungary to the north, being absorbed into it via personal union in 1102. Thus, these two factions became involved in a struggle in this area, intermittently controlling it as the balance shifted. During the reign of King Emeric, the Dalmatian cities separated from Hungary by a treaty. A consistent period of Hungarian rule in Dalmatia was ended with the Mongol invasion of Hungary in 1241. The Mongols severely impaired the feudal state, so much so that that same year, King Béla IV had to take refuge in Dalmatia, as far south as the Fortress of Klis. The Mongols attacked the Dalmatian cities for the next few years but eventually withdrew without major success.

At the beginning of the 14th century and until 1322, the Dalmatian cities were under the control of the Šubić noble family and held them until they were defeated at the Battle of Bliska by a coalition of nobles, Dalmatian cities and royal troops loyal to Charles I of Hungary.

In the south, due to its protected location, Kotor became a major city for the salt trade. The area was prosperous during the 14th century under the rule of Emperor of the Serbs Dušan the Mighty, who encouraged law enforcement, which helped the Bay of Kotor to become a safe place for doing business. In 1389, Tvrtko I, the founder of the Kingdom of Bosnia, was able to control the Adriatic littoral between Kotor and Šibenik, and even claimed control over the northern coast up to Rijeka, and his own independent ally, Republic of Ragusa. This was only temporary, as Hungary and the Venetians continued their struggle over Dalmatia after Tvrtko's death in 1391. By this time, the whole Hungarian and Croatian Kingdom was facing increasing internal difficulties, as a 20-year civil war ensued between the Capetian House of Anjou from the Kingdom of Naples, and King Sigismund of the House of Luxembourg. During the war, the losing contender, Ladislaus of Naples, sold his "rights" on Dalmatia to the Republic of Venice for a mere 100,000 ducats. The much more centralized Republic came to control all of Dalmatia by the year 1420, it was to remain under Venetian rule for 377 years (1420–1797).

Early modern period (1420–1815)

From 1420 to 1797 the Republic of Venice controlled most of Dalmatia, calling it Esclavonia in the 15th century with the southern enclave, the Bay of Kotor, being called Albania Veneta. Venetian was the commercial lingua franca in the Mediterranean at that time, and it heavily influenced Dalmatian and to a lesser degree coastal Croatian and Albanian.

The southern city of Ragusa (Dubrovnik) became de facto independent in 1358 through the Treaty of Zadar when Venice relinquished its suzerainty over it to Louis I of Hungary. In 1481, Ragusa switched allegiance to the Ottoman Empire. This gave its tradesmen advantages such as access to the Black Sea, and the Republic of Ragusa was the fiercest competitor to Venice's merchants in the 15th and 16th centuries.

At the end of the 16th century Slavicized Vlachs, other Vlachs and Serbs fled from Ottoman territory to the Military Frontier and Dalmatia. The Republic of Venice was also one of the powers most hostile to the Ottoman Empire's expansion, and participated in many wars against it. As the Ottomans took control of the Hinterland, many Christians took refuge in the coastal cities of Dalmatia. The border between the Dalmatian Hinterland and the Ottoman Bosnia and Herzegovina greatly fluctuated until the Morean War, when the Venetian capture of Knin and Sinj set much of the borderline at its current position.

After the Great Turkish War and the Treaty of Passarowitz, more peaceful times made Dalmatia experience a period of certain economic and cultural growth in the 18th century, with the re-establishment of trade and exchange with the hinterland. This period was abruptly interrupted with the fall of the Republic of Venice in 1797. Napoleon's troops stormed the region and ended the independence of the Republic of Ragusa as well, saving it from occupation by the Russian Empire and Montenegro.

In 1805, Napoleon created his Kingdom of Italy around the Adriatic Sea, annexing to it the former Venetian Dalmatia from Istria to Kotor. In 1808, he annexed the just conquered Republic of Ragusa to the Kingdom. A year later, in 1809, he removed the Venetian Dalmatia from his Kingdom of Italy and created the Illyrian Provinces, which were annexed to France, and named Marshal General Jean-de-Dieu Soult the Duke of Dalmatia.

Napoleon's rule in Dalmatia was marked with war and high taxation, which caused several rebellions. On the other hand, French rule greatly contributed to Croatian national revival (the first newspaper in Croatian was published then in Zadar, Il Regio Dalmata – Kraglski Dalmatin), the legal system and infrastructure were finally modernized somewhat in Dalmatia, and the educational system flourished. French rule brought a lot of improvements in infrastructure; many roads were built or reconstructed. Napoleon himself blamed Marshal of the Empire Auguste de Marmont, the governor of Dalmatia, that too much money was spent. However, in 1813, the Habsburgs once again declared war on France and, by the following year, had restored control over Dalmatia.

Nineteenth century

At the Congress of Vienna in 1815, Dalmatia was granted as a province to the Emperor of Austria. It was officially known as the Kingdom of Dalmatia.

In 1848, the Croatian Parliament (Sabor) published the People's Requests, in which they requested among other things the abolition of serfdom and the unification of Dalmatia and Croatia. The Dubrovnik municipality was the most outspoken of all the Dalmatian communes in its support for unification with Croatia. A letter was sent from Dubrovnik to Zagreb with pledges to work for this idea. In 1849, Dubrovnik continued to lead the Dalmatian cities in the struggle for unification. A large-scale campaign was launched in the Dubrovnik paper L'Avvenire (The Future) based on a clearly formulated programme: the federal system for the Habsburg territories, the inclusion of Dalmatia into Croatia and the Slavic brotherhood. The President of the Council of Kingdom of Dalmatia was Baron Vlaho Getaldić.

In the same year, the first issue of the Dubrovnik almanac appeared, Flower of the National Literature (Dubrovnik, cvijet narodnog književstva), in which Petar Preradović published his noted poem "Pjesma Dubrovniku" (Poem to Dubrovnik). This and other literary and journalistic texts, which continued to be published, contributed to the awakening of the national consciousness reflected in efforts to introduce the Croatian language into schools and offices, and to promote Croatian books. The Emperor Franz Joseph brought the March Constitution which prohibited the unification of Dalmatia and Croatia and also any further political activity with this end in view. The political struggle of Dubrovnik to be united with Croatia, which was intense throughout 1848–49, did not succeed at that time.

Many Dalmatian Italians looked with sympathy towards the Risorgimento movement that fought for the unification of Italy. However, after 1866, when the Veneto and Friuli regions were ceded by the Austrians to the newly formed Kingdom Italy, Dalmatia remained part of the Austro-Hungarian Empire, together with other Italian-speaking areas on the eastern Adriatic. This triggered the gradual rise of Italian irredentism among many Italians in Dalmatia, who demanded the unification of the Austrian Littoral, Fiume and Dalmatia with Italy. The Italians in Dalmatia supported the Italian Risorgimento: as a consequence, the Austrians saw the Italians as enemies and favored the Slav communities of Dalmatia.

During the meeting of the Council of Ministers of 12 November 1866, Emperor Franz Joseph I of Austria outlined a wide-ranging project aimed at the Germanization or Slavization of the areas of the empire with an Italian presence:

Dalmatia, especially its  maritime cities, once had a substantial local ethnic Italian population (Dalmatian Italians), making up 33% of the total population of Dalmatia in 1803, but this was reduced to 20% in 1816. According to Austrian censuses, the Dalmatian Italians formed 12.5% of the population in 1865, but this was reduced to 2.8% in 1910.

While Slavic-speakers made up 80-95% of the Dalmatia populace, only Italian language schools existed until 1848, and due to restrictive voting laws, the Italian-speaking aristocratic minority retained political control of Dalmatia.  Only after Austria liberalized elections in 1870, allowing more majority Slavs to vote, did Croatian parties gain control. Croatian finally became an official language in Dalmatia in 1883, along with Italian. Yet minority Italian-speakers continued to wield strong influence, since Austria favored Italians for government work, thus in the Austrian capital of Dalmatia, Zara, the proportion of Italians continued to grow, making it the only Dalmatian city with an Italian majority.

In 1861 was the meeting of the first Dalmatian Assembly, with representatives from Dubrovnik. Representatives of Kotor came to Dubrovnik to join the struggle for unification with Croatia. The citizens of Dubrovnik gave them a festive welcome, flying Croatian flags from the ramparts and exhibiting the slogan Ragusa with Kotor. The Kotorans elected a delegation to go to Vienna; Dubrovnik nominated Niko Pucić, who went to Vienna to demand not only the unification of Dalmatia with Croatia, but also the unification of all Croatian territories under one common Sabor. During this period, the Habsburgs carried out an aggressive anti-Italian policy through a forced Slavicisation of the region.

Twentieth century

In 1905, a dispute arose in the Austrian Imperial Council over whether Austria should pay for Dalmatia. It has been argued that in the conclusion of the April Laws is written "given by Banus Count Keglevich of Bužim", which explained the historical affiliation of Dalmatia to Hungary. Two years later Dalmatia elected representatives to the Austrian Imperial Council.

Until 1909, both Italian and Croatian were recognized as official languages in Dalmatia. After 1909, Italian lost its official status, thus it could no longer be used in the public and administrative sphere.

Dalmatia was a strategic region during World War I that both Italy and Serbia intended to seize from Austria-Hungary. Italy joined the Triple Entente Allies in 1915 upon agreeing to the Treaty of London that guaranteed Italy the right to annex a large portion of Dalmatia in exchange for Italy's participation on the Allied side. From 5–6 November 1918, Italian forces were reported to have reached Vis, Lastovo, Šibenik, and other localities on the Dalmatian coast. By the end of hostilities in November 1918, the Italian military had seized control of the entire portion of Dalmatia that had been guaranteed to Italy by the Treaty of London and by 17 November had seized Rijeka as well. In 1918, Admiral Enrico Millo declared himself Italy's Governor of Dalmatia. Famous Italian nationalist Gabriele D'Annunzio supported the seizure of Dalmatia, and proceeded to Zadar in an Italian warship in December 1918. However, in spite of the guarantees of the Treaty of London to Italy of a large portion of Dalmatia and Italian military occupation of claimed territories of Dalmatia, during the peace settlement negotiations of 1919 to 1920, the Fourteen Points of Woodrow Wilson that advocated self-determination of nations took precedence, with Italy only being permitted to annex Zadar from Dalmatia, while the rest of Dalmatia was to be part of Yugoslavia.

At the end of World War I, the Austrian Empire disintegrated, and Dalmatia was again split between the Kingdom of Serbs, Croats and Slovenes (later the Kingdom of Yugoslavia) which controlled most of it, and the Kingdom of Italy which held small portions of northern Dalmatia around Zadar and the islands of Cres, Lošinj, and Lastovo. Italy entered World War I in a territorial gamble, mostly to gain Dalmatia. But Italy got only a small part of its pretensions, so Dalmatia mostly stayed Yugoslav.

Despite the fact that there were only a few thousand Italian-speakers in Dalmatia, Italian nationalists continued to lay claim to all of Dalmatia. In 1927 Italy signed an agreement with the Croatian fascist, terrorist Ustaše organization. The Ustaše agreed that once they gained power, they will cede to Italy additional territory in Dalmatia and the Bay of Kotor, while renouncing all Croatian claims to Istria, Rijeka, Zadar and the Adriatic Islands.

In 1922, the territory of the former Kingdom of Dalmatia was divided into two provinces, the Oblast of Split and the Oblast of Dubrovnik. In 1929, the Littoral Banovina, a province of the Kingdom of Yugoslavia, was formed. Its capital was Split, and it included most of Dalmatia and parts of present-day Bosnia and Herzegovina. The southern parts of Dalmatia were in Zeta Banovina, from the Bay of Kotor to Pelješac peninsula including Dubrovnik. In 1939, Littoral Banovina was joined with Sava Banovina (and with smaller parts of other banovinas) to form a new province named the Banovina of Croatia. The same year, the ethnic Croatian areas of the Zeta Banovina from the Bay of Kotor to Pelješac, including Dubrovnik, were merged with a new Banovina of Croatia.

During World War II, in 1941, Nazi Germany, Fascist Italy, Hungary, and Bulgaria occupied Yugoslavia, redrawing their borders to include former parts of the Yugoslavian state. A new Nazi puppet state, the Independent State of Croatia (NDH), was created. With the Treaties of Rome, the NDH agreed to cede to Italy Dalmatian territory, creating the Governatorate of Dalmatia, from north of Zadar to south of Split, with inland areas, plus nearly all the Adriatic islands and Gorski Kotar. Italy then annexed these territories, while all the remainder of southern Croatia, including the entire coast, were placed under Italian occupation. Italy also appointed an Italian, Prince Aimone, Duke of Aosta, as king of Croatia.

Italy proceeded to Italianize the annexed areas of Dalmatia. Place names were Italianized, and Italian was made the official language in all schools, churches and government administration. All Croatian cultural societies were banned, while Italians took control of all key mineral, industrial and business establishments. Italian policies prompted resistance by Dalmatians, many joined the Partisans. This led to further Italian repressive measures - shooting of civilian hostages, burning of villages, confiscation of properties. Italians took many civilians to concentration camps - altogether, some 80,000 Dalmatians, 12% of the population, passed through Italian concentration camps.

Many Croats moved from the Italian-occupied area and took refuge in the satellite state of Croatia, which became the battleground for a guerrilla war between the Axis and the Yugoslav Partisans. Following the surrender of Italy in 1943, much of Italian-controlled Dalmatia was liberated by the Partisans, then taken over by German forces in a brutal campaign, who then returned control to the puppet Independent State of Croatia. Vis Island remained in Partisan hands, while Zadar, Rijeka, Istria, Cres, Lošinj, Lastovo and Palagruža became part of the German Operationszone Adriatisches Küstenland. The Partisans liberated Dalmatia in 1944, and with that Zadar, Rijeka, Istria, Cres, Lošinj, Lastovo and Palagruža became reunited with Croatia. After 1945, most of the remaining Dalmatian Italians fled the region (350,000 Italians escaped from Istria and Dalmatia in the Istrian-Dalmatian exodus). After World War II, Dalmatia became part of the People's Republic of Croatia, part of the Federative People's Republic of Yugoslavia.

The territory of former Kingdom of Dalmatia was divided between two federal republics of Yugoslavia and most of the territory went to Croatia, leaving only the Bay of Kotor to Montenegro. When Yugoslavia dissolved in 1991, those borders were retained and remain in force. During the Croatian War of Independence, most of Dalmatia was a battleground between the Government of Croatia and the Yugoslav People's Army (JNA), which aided the proto-state of Serbian Krajina, with much of the northern part of the region around Knin and the far south around, but not including, Dubrovnik being placed under the control of Serb forces. Croatia did regain the southern territories in 1992 but did not regain the north until Operation Storm in 1995. After the war, a number of towns and municipalities in the region were designated Areas of Special State Concern.

Cities by population
Split (161,312)
Zadar (70,829)
Šibenik (42,589)
Dubrovnik (41,671)
Other large towns include Biograd, Kaštela, Sinj, Solin, Omiš, Knin, Metković, Makarska, Trogir, Ploče, and Imotski.

Gallery

See also

Dalmatian (dog)—notable dog breed originating in the region

References

Bibliography

External links

 
 Dalmacija.hr – Official website of Split-Dalmatian County (in Croatian)
 Dalmatia.hr  – Official website of Croatian Tourism Board for Dalmatia

 
Historical regions in Croatia
Regions of Croatia